The 1998 Houston Cougars football team, also known as the Houston Cougars, Houston, or UH represented the University of Houston in the 1998 NCAA Division I-A football season.  It was the 53rd year of season play for Houston. The team was coached by Kim Helton.  The team played all its home games at Robertson Stadium, a 32,000-person capacity stadium on-campus in Houston, for the first time since 1950.

Schedule
The Cougars played both the Pac-10 Conference Champions, UCLA, as well as the SEC Champions and overall National Champions, Tennessee.

References

Houston
Houston Cougars football seasons
Houston Cougars football